Az Zaghfah is a village in eastern Yemen. It is located in the Hadhramaut Governorate near the coast, in the Ash Shihr District. Az Zaghfah is known by many names, including Al-Zaghfah, Zaghfa, and Zaghtal. The Sunrise and Sunset are at approximately 5:10 AM and 6:10 PM respectively. Its population, as of December 17, 2004, is 803, according to the Central Statistical Organization (Yemen.)who did a survey on that same date, and conducted its census in accordance with their roughly one decade long interval between such surveys.

Notes

References

External links
Towns and villages in the Hadhramaut Governorate

Populated places in Hadhramaut Governorate